The 2022 Minnesota gubernatorial election took place on November 8, 2022, to elect the governor of Minnesota. Incumbent Democratic (DFL) Governor Tim Walz defeated the Republican nominee, former state senator Scott Jensen, winning a second term.

Jensen's advantage in rural Greater Minnesota could not overcome Walz’s large lead in the Twin Cities metropolitan area, with Walz winning the election by a comfortable 7.7% margin. With his win, Walz gave the Minnesota Democratic–Farmer–Labor Party its fourth consecutive gubernatorial victory, the most in the party's history. Furthermore, the DFL held the State House and flipped the State Senate, gaining a trifecta for the first time since 2014.

Democratic–Farmer–Labor primary

Candidates

Nominee
 Tim Walz, incumbent governor and former U.S. representative for Minnesota's 1st congressional district (2007–2019)
 Peggy Flanagan, incumbent lieutenant governor

Eliminated in primary
Ole Savior, perennial candidate
Julia M. Parker

Results

Republican primary

Candidates

Nominee
Scott Jensen, family medicine physician and former state senator
Matt Birk, former professional football player with the Minnesota Vikings, businessman, and author

Eliminated in primary
Bob "Again" Carney Jr, candidate for U.S. Senate in 2020
Captain Jack Sparrow, perennial candidate
Joyce Lynne Lacey
Kent Edwards

Withdrawn
Michelle Benson, state senator
Thomas Evensted, activist
Paul Gazelka, state senator and former majority leader of the Minnesota Senate 
Mike Marti, businessman
Mike Murphy, mayor of Lexington 
Kendall Qualls, Army Veteran, Businessman and Republican nominee for Minnesota's 3rd congressional district in 2020
Neil Shah, physician and business owner 
Rich Stanek, former Hennepin County Sheriff

Declined 
Matt Birk, former Minnesota Vikings player (endorsed Jensen and became his running mate)
 Mike Lindell, inventor of My Pillow, businessman
Carla Nelson, state senator (ran for reelection)
 Pete Stauber, U.S. representative for Minnesota's 8th congressional district (ran for reelection)
 Karin Housley, state senator and nominee for the U.S. Senate in 2018 (ran for reelection)
Jennifer Carnahan, former chair of the Minnesota Republican Party (2017–2021) and widow of U.S. Representative Jim Hagedorn  (unsuccessfully ran for Congress in a 2022 special election)
Rob Barrett, businessman, activist and candidate for the U.S. Senate in 2020

Caucuses and conventions

Caucus
The caucuses took place on February 1, 2022. A caucus is a local meeting where all who intend to vote for the Republican Party are able to select their precinct leadership, participate in a straw poll for governor, write and pass resolutions, and elect delegates to their local Basic Political Organizational Unit (BPOU). Those who were not elected BPOU delegates could become alternates and fill in for delegates who cannot attend the BPOU convention.

BPOU conventions
A BPOU has boundaries based on the county or state senate district a voter resides in. The majority of these took place in March 2022. Elected delegates of each BPOU attended a convention relating to their district to vote on the resolutions passed at the caucus, complete party business, listen to candidates, and elect delegates to the state convention and their corresponding U.S. House District convention.

State convention   
The Republican State Convention was held on May 13–14, 2022 in Rochester. 2,200 delegates were elected statewide to decide the Minnesota Republican Party's endorsement in all statewide offices. The endorsed candidate receives the party's backing, including money and resources, ahead of the August 9 primary. Only one Republican, incumbent Governor Arne Carlson in 1994, has won the primary without the party's endorsement. (Two Democrats, Mark Dayton and Tim Walz, won the Democratic primary against endorsed candidates.)

At the convention, Scott Jensen won the endorsement with 65% of the vote on the ninth ballot, defeating Kendall Qualls. Mike Murphy, Paul Gazelka, and Neil Shah were eliminated on earlier ballots. All the candidates who contested the endorsement pledged to forego the primary if not endorsed.

Qualls soon honored his pledge by announcing his plans to "return to private life." Rich Stanek, the only major candidate who did not compete for the endorsement, did not file for the primary, leaving Jensen without major opposition. He faced two minor candidates in the August primary.

Endorsements

Results

Independents and others

Grassroots-Legalize Cannabis primary

Candidates

Nominee
Steve Patterson, anti-lockdown activist
Matt Huff

Eliminated in primary 
Darrell Paulsen, business consultant, nominee for lieutenant governor in 1998
Edwin Engelmann, nominee for lieutenant governor in 2010

Results

Legal Marijuana Now primary

Candidates

Nominee
James McCaskel, community organizer and BLM activist 
David Sandbeck, activist and candidate for Minnesota's 4th congressional district in 2020

Eliminated in primary 
Chris Wright, perennial candidate
L.C. Lawrence Converse

Results

Other parties 
Gabrielle M. Prosser, restaurant worker (Socialist Workers)
Kevin A. Dwire, perennial candidate
Hugh McTavish, scientist, entrepreneur and author (Independence-Alliance Party)
Mike Winter, commercial driver, podcast host, Teamster Union steward and candidate for mayor of Minneapolis in 2021

Withdrew 
Cory Hepola, former WCCO Radio host (Forward Party)
Tamara Uselman, school administrator
Brandon Millholland-Corcoran

Declined 
Tom Bakk, state senator and DFL candidate for governor in 2010
Christopher Chamberlin, candidate for governor, Senate, and House in 2018
Richard Painter, University of Minnesota Law School professor, former chief White House ethics lawyer, and DFL candidate for U.S. Senate in 2018 (ran for Congress)

Endorsements

General election

Campaign

The election's central issues were the economy, rising crime, Walz’s response to the COVID-19 pandemic, education, and abortion access following the Supreme Court decision overturning Roe v. Wade.

Walz campaigned on his first-term accomplishments, such as middle-class tax cuts, while making abortion rights a prominent focus of the campaign and attacking Jensen on abortion and his COVID-19 skepticism. Jensen attacked Walz over his COVID-19 policies, crime in the Twin Cities, inflation and gas prices, and education performance.

Jensen was criticized for promoting the hoax that schools provided litter boxes to students who identify as furries.

Debates

Predictions

Endorsements

Polling
Aggregate polls

Graphical summary

Tim Walz vs. Michelle Benson

Tim Walz vs. Paul Gazelka

Tim Walz vs. Mike Marti

Tim Walz vs. Mike Murphy

Tim Walz vs. Kendall Qualls

Tim Walz vs. Neil Shah

Tim Walz vs. Rich Stanek

Tim Walz vs. generic Republican

Results

Results by county

See also
 2022 United States gubernatorial elections
 2022 Minnesota elections
 2022 Minnesota Senate election
 2022 Minnesota House of Representatives election
 Litter boxes in schools hoax

Notes

Partisan clients

References

External links 
 Elections & Voting - Minnesota Secretary of State

Official campaign websites
 Cory Hepola (F) for Governor
 Scott Jensen (R) for Governor
 James McCaskel (LMN) for Governor
 Hugh McTavish (I) for Governor
 Brandon Millholland-Corcoran (I) for Governor
 Darrell Paulsen (GLC) for Governor
 Tim Walz (D) for Governor
 Chris Wright (LMN) for Governor

Minnesota
2022
Gubernatorial